William Justice Ford (7 November 1853 – 3 April 1904) was an English schoolmaster, known as a cricketer and sports writer.

Life
The eldest of seven sons of William Augustus Ford, of Lincoln's Inn Fields, by his wife Katherine Mary Justice, he was born in London on 7 November 1853; of his brothers, Augustus Frank Justice (b. 1858) and Francis Gilbertson Justice (b. 1866) distinguished themselves in Repton, Cambridge University, and Middlesex cricket, while a third, Lionel George Bridges Justice (b. 1865), became headmaster of Harrow School in 1910. Educated at Eagle House, Wimbledon, and at Repton School, where he played in the cricket eleven (1870–2), William entered St. John's College, Cambridge, as minor scholar in 1872, having first entered Trinity College earlier that year. He became foundation scholar in 1874, and graduated B.A. with second-class classical honours in 1876, proceeding M.A. in 1878.

Ford was a master at Marlborough College from 1877 to 1886, and from that year until 1889 was headmaster of Nelson College, New Zealand. On his return to England he became in April 1890 headmaster of Leamington College, from which he retired in 1893.

Ford died of pneumonia at Abingdon Mansions on 3 April 1904, and was buried at Kensal Green.

Cricketer
Ford was a cricket blue at Cambridge, and played for Middlesex. He was 6 ft. 3 in. in height and weighed in 1886 over 17 stone. He was reputed as one of the hardest-hitting cricketers, surpassed only by Charles Inglis Thornton. His longest authenticated hit was 144 yards; in August 1885 at Maidstone he scored 44 runs in 17 minutes in the first innings, and 75 runs in 45 minutes in the second innings for Middlesex v. Kent. He was a slow round arm bowler and a good field at point.

Works
After retiring from teaching, Ford wrote on cricket, publishing A Cricketer on Cricket (1900); Middlesex County Cricket Club 1864–1899 (1900); and A History of the Cambridge University Cricket Club 1820–1901 (1902). He compiled the articles on "Public School Cricket" for Wisden's Cricketers' Almanack from 1896 to 1904 and in Prince Ranjitsinhji's Jubilee Book of Cricket (1897). He also contributed articles to the Cyclopaedia of Sport and to the Encyclopædia Britannica, and the chapter on "Pyramids and Pool" to the Badminton Library volume Billiards.

Family
Ford married Katherine Macey Browning at All Saints' Church, Nelson, on 22 December 1887.

Notes

Attribution

1853 births
1904 deaths
English cricketers
Cambridge University cricketers
Middlesex cricketers
Marylebone Cricket Club cricketers
Nelson cricketers
Non-international England cricketers
Gentlemen of the South cricketers
Heads of schools in England
English sportswriters
Nelson College faculty
Alumni of St John's College, Cambridge
Heads of schools in New Zealand
English expatriates in New Zealand
Cricket historians and writers
Deaths from pneumonia in England